The Church of Saint Anthony is a Roman Catholic church in Knin, Croatia.

History

Construction of church started in 1860, and was completed in 1863.
During World War II, the church sustained some damage due to bombings. It completed renovations in 1960.

During the Croatian War of Independence, the church was completely destroyed by rebel Serbs. After the war, the Franciscans started with renovation of monastery and church. The new church was re-dedicated on 6 December 1998.

References 

Churches in Croatia
Buildings and structures in Šibenik-Knin County
Knin
Tourist attractions in Šibenik-Knin County